Daniel Petronijevic (born March 28, 1981 in Scarborough, Ontario), known professionally as Dan Petronijevic, is a Canadian actor who has appeared in various feature films, including the American Pie franchise, and in TV shows such as 19-2, Playmakers, Cardinal, and Letterkenny. He also has extensive experience doing voice acting for numerous animated series. His most recent acting role was playing detective Marv Bozwick in the film Spiral.

Early life
Petronijevic is of Serbian descent. He was born on March 28, 1981 in Scarborough, Ontario, Canada, and moved with his family from Scarborough to Scugog Township as a youth. He made his theatrical debut as a teenager in Port Perry, where he was spotted by a talent agent.

Career
Petronijevic is best known for his role as the antagonistic Montreal Police Service Officer J.M. Brouillard in the English adaptation of the ensemble police drama 19-2. For that role, he was nominated "Best Performance by an Actor in a Featured Supporting Role in a Dramatic Program or Series" at the Canadian Screen Awards in 2014.

Petronijevic also won the role of Thad Guerwitcz in ESPN's 2003 sports drama Playmakers. He played a closeted professional football player who is outed by his boyfriend.

Petronijevic's other roles include Brody in Todd and the Book of Pure Evil (TV series and film) and Ronald Stiviletto in Happy Town. He also worked on the shows PSI Factor, Earth: Final Conflict, Republic of Doyle, Saving Hope, and Rookie Blue. Petronijevic played the role of Bull in the films American Pie Presents: The Naked Mile and American Pie Presents: Beta House. Along with Malin Åkerman, he co-starred in Cottage Country. Other films he has appeared in include Angel Eyes with Jennifer Lopez and The Prince and Me with Julia Stiles respectively.

Petronijevic has the recurring role of McMurray in the Canadian sitcom Letterkenny, a series which was created by his fellow 19-2 actor Jared Keeso. He also co-stars in the second season of the crime drama Cardinal as the drug enforcer Leon.

Petronijevic is also a prolific voice actor, having worked on numerous animated television series. He voiced and sang as the character Geoff in Total Drama Island, Total Drama Action, and Total Drama World Tour. He later reprised the role in the spin-off series Total Drama Presents: The Ridonculous Race. He voiced Adam Spitz in the cartoon series Braceface. He has also played several characters on the show Bakugan including those of Spectra, Julio Santana, and more recently, Jake Vallory. Other characters include Tarantula Boy on Growing Up Creepie, Corey on 6teen, GT on Turbo Dogs and most recently Trent Trotter on Corn & Peg.

Petronijevic also plays the role of Erik in Di-Gata Defenders. He is a voice actor in Beyblade: Metal Fusion, performing the roles of Blader DJ, Dynamis and Dashan Wang. He provided the voice over narration in Beyblade: Shogun Steel and BeyWarriors: BeyRaiderz.

Since 2007, he has been the official announcer of the Teletoon network.

Filmography

Features and TV

 1995 - To Save the Children (TV Movie)
 1995 - Are You Afraid of the Dark (TV Series)
 1996 - Ready or Not (TV Series)
 1996 - Goosebumps (TV Series)
 1996 - Night of the Twisters (TV Movie)
 1996 - Hostile Advances: The Kerry Ellison Story (TV Movie)
 1996 - Hidden in America (TV Movie)
 1997 - Flash Forward (TV Series)
 1997 - In His Father's Shoes (TV Movie)
 1998 - Blind Faith (Feature)
 1998 - Dream House (TV Movie)
 1999 - Animorphs (TV Series)
 1999 - A Gift of Love: The Daniel Huffman Story  (TV Movie)
 1999 - PSI Factor: Chronicles of the Paranormal (TV Series)
 2000 - Power Play (TV Series)
 2000 - Wind at My Back (TV Series) 
 2001 - Angel Eyes (Feature)
 2001 - High Explosive (Feature)
 2001 - Jett Jackson: The Movie (TV Movie)
 2001 - My Horrible Year! (TV Movie)
 2001 - Dangerous Child (TV Movie)
 2002 - The Circle (Feature)
 2002 - Earth: Final Conflict (TV Series)
 2002 - Witchblade (TV Series)
 2002 - Two Against Time (TV Movie)
 2003 - The Eleventh Hour (TV Series)
 2003 - Soldier's Girl (TV Movie)
 2003 - Twelve Mile Road (TV Movie)
 2003 - Word of Honor (TV Movie)
 2003 - Playmakers (TV Series)
 2004 - The Prince and Me (Feature)
 2005 - Absolution (TV Movie)
 2005 - Code Breakers (TV Movie)
 2005 - Kojak (TV Series)
 2005 - Our Fathers (TV Movie)
 2006 - American Pie Presents The Naked Mile (Feature)
 2006 - Snapshots for Henry
 2007 - 'Til Death Do Us Part (Mini Series)
 2007 - The Dresden Files (Mini Series)
 2007 - The Company (TV Mini Series)
 2007 - American Pie Presents: Beta House (Feature)
 2008 - Menace (TV Movie)
 2008 - M.V.P. (TV Series)
 2008 - For the Love of Grace (TV Movie)
 2008 - The Border (TV Series)
 2009 - Throwing Stones (TV Movie)
 2009 - Carny (TV Movie)
 2009 - The Line (TV Series)
 2009 - The Dating Guy (TV Series)
 2010 - Happy Town  (TV Series)
 2010 - Harm's Way (Feature)
 2011 - Murdoch Mysteries (TV Series)
 2011 - Falling Skies (TV Series)
 2011 - Against the Wall (TV Series)
 2010-2012 - Todd and the Book of Pure Evil (TV Series)
 2012 - Rookie Blue (TV Series)
 2012 - Saving Hope (TV Series)
 2012 - Republic of Doyle (TV Series)
 2013 - Played (TV Series)
 2013 - Cottage Country (Feature)
 2014 - Bitten (TV Series)
 2011-2015 - 19-2 (TV Series)
 2015 - He Never Died (Feature)
 2016-2020 - Letterkenny (TV Series)
 2017 - Todd and the Book of Pure Evil (Feature)
 2018 - Cardinal (TV Series)
 2020 - Transplant Season 1 Episode 9 "Under Pressure", played Officer Brent
 2021 - Spiral'' (Feature) as Detective Marv "Boz" Bozwick

Animated Series

2000 Butt Ugly Martians (Voice)
2001-2004 Braceface (Voice)
2002 Moville Mysteries (Voice)
2004 6teen (Voice)
2006 Growing Up Creepie (Voice)
2006-2007 Di-Gata Defenders (Voice)
2007 Bakugan Battle Brawlers (English Voice)
2007 Total Drama Island (Voice)
2007-2010 Magi-Nation (Voice)
2009 The Amazing Spiez (Voice)
2009 Total Drama Action (Voice)
2010 The Adventures of Chuck and Friends (Voice)
2010-2011 Turbo Dogs (Voice)
2012 Beyblade: Shogun Steel (English Voice)
2011-2012 Redakai (Voice)
2009 Beyblade: Metal Fusion (English Voice)
2010 Total Drama World Tour (Voice)
2013 Fish N Chips: The Movie (Voice)
2014-2017 Trucktown (Voice)
2015 Total Drama Presents: The Ridonculous Race (Voice)
2018–2023 Bakugan: Battle Planet (English Voice)
2019-2020 Corn & Peg (Voice)
2019–present Norman Picklestripes (Voice)
2021 Battle Game in 5 Seconds (English Voice)

References

External links
 
 
 

1981 births
Living people
Canadian male voice actors
Canadian male television actors
Canadian people of Serbian descent
People from Scugog